The Four Ramps are a group of four small rock spurs, roughly parallel and projecting through the snow surface, forming the northeast part of Sullivan Ridge on the west side of Ramsey Glacier, Antarctica. They were discovered and photographed by U.S. Navy Operation Highjump (1946–47) and given this descriptive name by the Advisory Committee on Antarctic Names.

References 

Ridges of the Ross Dependency
Dufek Coast